Abinader is a surname. Notable people with the surname include:

Elmaz Abinader (born 1954), Arab-American author, poet, and academic 
José Rafael Abinader (1929–2018), Dominican politician, lawyer, and writer
Luis Abinader (born 1967), Dominican economist, businessman, and politician